Al-Malik al-Zahir Rukn al-Din Baybars al-Bunduqdari (al-Malik al-Ẓāhir Rukn al-Dīn Baybars al-Bunduqdārī) (1223/1228 – 1 July 1277), commonly known as Baibars or Baybars and nicknamed Abu al-Futuh ('Father of Conquests'), was the fourth Mamluk sultan of Egypt and Syria, of Turkic Kipchak origin, in the Bahri dynasty, succeeding Qutuz.  He was one of the commanders of the Egyptian forces that inflicted a defeat on the Seventh Crusade of King Louis IX of France. He also led the vanguard of the Egyptian army at the Battle of Ain Jalut in 1260, which marked the first substantial defeat of the Mongol army and is considered a turning point in history.

The reign of Baybars marked the start of an age of Mamluk dominance in the Eastern Mediterranean and solidified the durability of their military system. He managed to pave the way for the end of the Crusader presence in the Levant and reinforced the union of Egypt and Syria as the region's pre-eminent Muslim state, able to fend off threats from both Crusaders and Mongols, and even managed to subdue the kingdom of Makuria, which was famous for being unconquerable by previous Muslim empire invasion attempts. As sultan, Baybars also engaged in a combination of diplomacy and military action, allowing the Mamluks of Egypt to greatly expand their empire.

Name
In his native Turkic language, Baybars' name means "great panther" or "lord panther" (see also Wiktionary: bay "rich person, noble" + pars "leopard, panther").

Physical appearance 
Baybars was described as a tall man with olive skin and blue eyes. He had broad shoulders, slim legs, and a powerful voice. It was observed that he had cataract in one eye.

Blazon

Possibly based on the Turkic meaning of his name, Baybars used the panther as his heraldic blazon, and placed it on both coins and buildings. The lion/panther used on the bridge built by Baybars near al-Ludd (today's Lod) plays with a rat, which may be interpreted to represent Baybars' Crusader enemies.

Early life
Baibars was a Kipchak thought to be born in the Dasht-i Kipchak - between the Edil (Volga) and Yaiyk (Ural) rivers - while other sources specify this as in the Kazakhstan. There is a discrepancy in Ibn Taghrībirdī's dating of his birth, since he says it took place in 625 AH (12 December 1227 – 29 November 1228) and also that Baybars was about 24 years old in 1247, which would put his birth closer to 1223. He belonged to the Barli tribe. According to a fellow Cuman and eyewitness, Badr al-Din Baysari, the Barli fled the armies of the Mongols, arranging to settle in the Second Bulgarian Empire (named in the sources Wallachia). They crossed the Black Sea from either Crimea or Alania, where they had arrived to Bulgaria about 1242. In the meantime, the Mongols invaded Bulgaria, including the regions where the Cuman refugees recently settled. Both Baybars, who witnessed his parents being massacred, and Baysari were among the captives during the invasion and were sold into slavery in the Sultanate of Rum at the slave market in Sivas. In 1247, al-Bunduqārī was arrested and the sultan of Egypt, As-Salih Ayyub, confiscated his slaves, including Baybars.

Rise to power

In 1250, he supported the defeat of the Seventh Crusade of Louis IX of France in two major battles.  The first was the Battle of Al Mansurah, where he employed an ingenious strategy in ordering the opening of a gate to let the crusader knights enter the town; the crusaders rushed into the town that they thought was deserted to find themselves trapped inside. They were besieged from all directions by the Egyptian forces and the town population, and suffered heavy losses. Robert of Artois, who took refuge in a house, and William of Salisbury were both killed, along with most of the Knights Templar. Only five Templar Knights escaped alive. The second was the Battle of Fariskur which essentially ended the Seventh Crusade and led to the capture of Louis IX.  Egyptian forces in that battle were led by Sultan Turanshah, the young son of recently deceased as-Salih Ayyub. Shortly after the victory over the Crusaders, Baybars and a group of Mamluk soldiers assassinated Turanshah, leading to as-Salih Ayyub's widow Shajar al-Durr being named sultana.

In 1254, a power shift occurred in Egypt, as Aybak killed Faris ad-Din Aktai, the leader of the Bahri Mamluks. Some of his Mamluks, among them Baybars and Qalawun al-Alfi, fled to an-Nasir Yusuf in Syria, persuading him to break the accord and invade Egypt. Aybak wrote to an-Nassir Yusuf warning him of the danger of these Mamluks who took refuge in Syria, and agreed to grant him their territorial domains on the coast, but an-Nasir Yusuf refused to expel them and instead returned to them the domains which Aybak had granted. In 1255, an-Nasir Yusuf sent new forces to the Egyptian border, this time with many of Aktai's Mamluks, among them Baybars, and Qalawun al-Alfi, but he was defeated again. In 1257, Baybars and other Bahri Mamluks left Damascus to Jerusalem, where they deposed its governor Kütük and plundered its markets, then they did the same in Gaza. Later on, they fought against the forces of an-Nasir Yusuf at Nablus, then fled to join the forces of al-Mughith Umar in Kerak. The combined forces tried in vain to invade Egypt during the reign of Aybak. 

Baybars then sent 'Ala al-Din Taybars al-Waziri to discuss with Qutuz his return to Egypt, which was eagerly accepted. He was still a commander under sultan Qutuz at the Battle of Ain Jalut in 1260, when he decisively defeated the Mongols. After the battle, Sultan Qutuz (aka Koetoez) was assassinated while on a hunting expedition. It was said that Baybars was involved in the assassination because he expected to be rewarded with the governorship of Aleppo for his military success, but Qutuz, fearing his ambition, refused to give him the post. Baybars succeeded Qutuz as Sultan of Egypt.

Sultan of Egypt
Soon after Baybars had ascended to the Sultanate, his authority was confirmed without any serious resistance, except from Alam al-Din Sinjar al-Halabi, another Mamluk amir who was popular and powerful enough to claim Damascus. Also, the threat from the Mongols was still serious enough to be considered as a threat to Baybars' authority. However, Baybars first chose to deal with Sinjar, and marched on Damascus. At the same time the princes of Hama and Homs proved able to defeat the Mongols in the First Battle of Homs, which lifted the Mongol threat for a while. On 17 January 1261, Baibars' forces were able to rout the troops of Sinjar outside Damascus, and pursued the attack to the city, where the citizens were loyal to Sinjar and resisted Baibars, although their resistance was soon crushed.

There was also a brief rebellion in Cairo led by a leading figure of the Shiite named al-Kurani. Al-Kurani is said originated from Nishapur. Al-Kurani and his follower are recorded to have attacked the weapon stores and stables of Cairo during a night raid. Baibars, however, manage to suppress the rebellion quickly as he surrounded and arrested them all. Al- Kurani and another rebel leaders were executed (crucified) in Bab Zuweila

After suppressing the revolt of Sinjar, Baibars then managed to deal with the Ayyubids, while quietly eliminating the prince of Kerak. Ayyubids such as Al-Ashraf Musa, Emir of Homs and the Ayyubid Emir Dynasty of Hama Al-Mansur Muhammad II, who had earlier staved off the Mongol threat, were permitted to continue their rule in exchange for their recognizing Baibars' authority as Sultan.

After the Abbasid caliphate in Iraq was overthrown by the Mongols in 1258 when they conquered and  sacked Baghdad, the Muslim world lacked a caliph, a theoretically supreme leader who had sometimes used his office to endow distant Muslim rulers with legitimacy by sending them writs of investiture. Thus, when the Abbasid refugee Abu al-Qasim Ahmad, the uncle of the last Abbasid caliph  al-Musta‘sim, arrived in Cairo in 1261, Baibars had him proclaimed caliph as al-Mustansir II and duly received investiture as sultan from him. Unfortunately, al-Mustansir II was killed by the Mongols during an ill-advised expedition to recapture Baghdad from the Mongols later in the same year. In 1262, another Abbasid, allegedly the great-great-great grandson of the Caliph al-Mustarshid, Abu al-‘Abbas Ahmad, who had survived from the defeated expedition, was proclaimed caliph as al-Hakim I, inaugurating the line of Abbasid caliphs of Cairo that continued as long as the  Mamluk sultanate, until 1517. Like his unfortunate predecessor, al-Hakim I also received the formal oath of allegiance of Baibars and provided him with legitimation. While most of the Muslim world did not take these caliphs seriously, as they were mere instruments of the sultans, they still lent a certain legitimation as well as a decorative element to their rule.

Campaign against the Crusaders

As sultan, Baibars engaged in a lifelong struggle against the Crusader kingdoms in Syria, in part because the Christians had aided the Mongols. He started with the Principality of Antioch, which had become a vassal state of the Mongols and had participated in attacks against Islamic targets in Damascus and Syria. In 1263, Baibars laid siege to Acre, the capital of the remnant of the Kingdom of Jerusalem, although the siege was abandoned when he sacked Nazareth instead. He used siege engines to defeat the Crusaders in battles such as the Fall of Arsuf from 21 March to 30 April. After breaking into the town he offered free passage to the defending Knights Hospitallers if they surrendered their formidable citadel. The Knights accepted Baibars' offer but were enslaved anyway. Baibars razed the castle to the ground. He next attacked Atlit and Haifa, where he captured both towns after destroying the crusaders' resistance, and razed the citadels.

In the same year, Baibars laid siege to the fortress of Safed, held by the Templar knights, which had been conquered by Saladin in 1188 but returned to the Kingdom of Jerusalem in 1240. Baibars promised the knights safe passage to the Christian town of Acre if they surrendered their fortress. Badly outnumbered, the knights agreed. Upon surrender, Baibars broke his promise and massacred the entire Templar garrison. On capturing Safed, Baibars did not raze the fortress to the ground but fortified and repaired it instead, as it was strategically situated and well constructed. He installed a new governor in Safed, with the rank of Wali.

Later, in 1266, Baibars invaded the Christian country of Cilician Armenia which, under King Hethum I, had submitted to the Mongol Empire. After defeating the forces of Hethum I in the Battle of Mari, Baibars managed to ravage the three great cities of Mamistra, Adana and Tarsus, so that when Hetoum arrived with Mongol troops, the country was already devastated. Hetoum had to negotiate the return of his son Leo by giving control of Armenia's border fortresses to the Mamluks. In 1269, Hetoum abdicated in favour of his son and became a monk, but he died a year later. Leo was left in the awkward situation of keeping Cilicia as a subject of the Mongol Empire, while at the same time paying tribute to the Mamluks.

This isolated Antioch and Tripoli, led by Hethum's son-in-law, Prince Bohemond VI. After successfully conquering Cilicila, Baibars in 1267 settled his unfinished business with Acre, and continued the extermination of remaining crusader garrisons in the following years. In 1268, he besieged Antioch, capturing the city on 18 May. Baibars had promised to spare the lives of the inhabitants, but he broke his promise and had the city razed, killing or enslaving much of the population after the surrender. prompting the fall of the Principality of Antioch. The massacre of men, women, and children at Antioch "was the single greatest massacre of the entire crusading era." Priests had their throats slit inside their churches, and women were sold into slavery.

Then he continued to Jaffa, which belonged to Guy, the son of John of Ibelin. Jaffa fell to Baibars on 7 March after twelve hours of fighting; most of Jaffa's citizens were slain, but Baibars allowed the garrison to go unharmed. After this he conquered Ashkalon and Caesarea.

Diplomacy with Golden Horde
In some time around October to November 1267, or about 666 Safar of Hijra year, Baibars wrote condolences and congratulations to the new Khan of the Golden Horde, Mengu-Timur, to urge him to fight Abaqa. Despite the failure to incite infighting between the Golden Horde and Ilkhanate, Baibars continued to conduct warm correspondence with the Golden Horde, particularly with Mengu Timur's general Noqai, who unlike Mengu Timur was very cooperative with Baibars. It is theorized that this intimacy was not only due to the religious connection (as Noqai was a Muslim, unlike his Khan), but also because Noqai was not really fond of Mengu-Timur. However, Baibars was pragmatic in his approach and did not want to become involved in complicated intrigue inside the Golden Horde, so instead he stayed close to both Mengu Timur and Noqai.

Continued campaign against Crusaders

On March 30th 1271, after Baibars captured the smaller castles in the area, including Chastel Blanc, he besieged the Krak des Chevaliers, held by the Hospitallers. Peasants who lived in the area had fled to the castle for safety and were kept in the outer ward. As soon as Baibars arrived, he began erecting mangonels, powerful siege weapons which he would turn on the castle. According to Ibn Shaddad, two days later the first line of defences was captured by the besiegers; he was probably referring to a walled suburb outside the castle's entrance. After a lull of ten days, the besiegers conveyed a letter to the garrison, supposedly from the Grand Master of the Knights Hospitaller in Tripoli, Hugues de Revel, which granted permission for them to surrender. The garrison capitulated and the Sultan spared their lives. The new owners of the castle undertook repairs, focused mainly on the outer ward. The Hospitaller chapel was converted to a mosque and two mihrabs were added to the interior.

Baibars then turned his attention to Tripoli, but he interrupted his siege there to call a truce in May 1271.  The fall of Antioch had led to the brief Ninth Crusade, led by Prince Edward of England, who arrived in Acre in May 1271 and attempted to ally himself with the Mongols against Baibars.  So Baibars declared a truce with Tripoli, as well as with Edward, who was never able to capture any territory from Baibars anyway. According to some reports, Baibars tried to have Edward assassinated with poison, but Edward survived the attempt and returned home in 1272.

Campaign against Makuria

In 1272, the Mamluk Sultan invaded the Kingdom of Makuria, after its King David I had raided the Egyptian city of Aidhab, initiating several decades of intervention by the Mamlukes in Nubian affairs. Hostilities toward the dying Christian kingdom were sidelined as Baibars' invasion of Makuria continued for four years until the Mamluks defeated the Nubians in the Battle of Dongola, by 1276, Baibars had completed his conquest of Nubia, Including the Medieval lower Nubia which was ruled by Banu Kanz. Under the terms of the settlement, the Nubians were now subjected to paying jizya tribute, and in return they were allowed to keep their religion, being protected under Islamic law as 'People of the Book'; they were also allowed to continue being governed by a king from the native royal family, although this king was chosen personally by Baibars, namely a Makurian noble named Shakanda. In practice this was reducing Makuria to a vassal kingdom, effectively ending Makuria's status as an independent kingdom.

Campaign against the Mongols

In 1277, Baibars invaded the Seljuq Sultanate of Rûm, then controlled by the Ilkhanate Mongols. He defeated a Mongol army at the Battle of Elbistan and captured the city of Kayseri. Baibars himself went with a few troops to deal with the Mongol right flank that was pounding his left wing. Baibars ordered a force from the army from Hama to reinforce his left. The large Mamluk numbers were able to overwhelm the Mongol force, who instead of retreating dismounted from their horses. Some Mongols were able to escape and took up positions on the hills. Once they became surrounded they once again dismounted, and fought to the death. During the celebration of victory, Baybars said that "How can I be happy? Before I had thought that I and my servants would defeat the Mongols, but my left wing was beaten by them. Only Allah helped us".

The possibility of a new Mongol army convinced Baibars to return to Syria, since he was far away from his bases and supply line. As the Mamluk army returned to Syria the commander of the Mamluk vanguard, Izz al-Din Aybeg al-Shaykhi, deserted to the Mongols. Pervâne sent a letter to Baibars asking him to delay his departure. Baibars chastised him for not aiding him during the Battle of Elbistan. Baibars told him he was leaving for Sivas to mislead Pervâne and the Mongols as to his true destination. Baibars also sent Taybars al-Waziri with a force to raid the Armenian town of al-Rummana, whose inhabitants had hidden the Mongols earlier.

Death
Baibars died in Damascus on 1 July 1277, when he was 53 years old.  His demise has been the subject of some academic speculation.  Many sources agree that he died from drinking poisoned kumis that was intended for someone else. Other accounts suggest that he may have died from a wound while campaigning, or from illness. He was buried in the Az-Zahiriyah Library in Damascus.

Family
One of Baibar's wives was the daughter of Amir Sayf ad-Din Nogay at-Tatari. Another wife was the daughter of Amir Sayf ad-Din Giray at-Tatari. Another wife was the daughter of Amir Sayf ad-Din Tammaji. Another wife was Iltutmish Khatun. She was the daughter of Barka Khan, a former Khwarazmian amir. She was the mother of his son Al-Said Barakah. She died in 1284–85. Another wife was the daughter Karmun Agha, a Mongol Amir. He had three sons al-Said Barakah, Solamish and Khizir. He had seven daughters; one of them was named Tidhkarbay Khatun.

Assessment

As the first Sultan of the Bahri Mamluk dynasty, Baibars made the meritocratic ascent up the ranks of Mamluk society.  He took final control after the assassination of Sultan Sayf al Din Qutuz, but before he became Sultan he commanded Mamluk forces in the decisive Battle of Ain Jalut in 1260, repelling Mongol forces from Syria. Although in the Muslim world he has been considered a national hero for centuries, and in the Near East and Kazakhstan is still regarded as such, Sultan Baibars was reviled in the Christian world of the time for his successful campaigns against the Crusader States. A Templar knight who fought in the Seventh Crusade lamented:

Baibars also played an important role in bringing the Mongols to Islam.  He developed strong ties with the Mongols of the Golden Horde and took steps for the Golden Horde Mongols to travel to Egypt.  The arrival of the Mongol's Golden Horde to Egypt resulted in a significant number of Mongols accepting Islam.

Legacy

Military legacy
Baibars was a popular ruler in the Muslim world who had defeated the crusaders in three campaigns, and the Mongols in the Battle of Ain Jalut which many scholars deem of great macro-historical importance.  In order to support his military campaigns, Baibars commissioned arsenals, warships and cargo vessels. He was also arguably the first to employ explosive hand cannons in war, at the Battle of Ain Jalut. His military campaign also extended into Libya and Nubia.

Culture and science

He was also an efficient administrator who took interest in building various infrastructure projects, such as a mounted message relay system capable of delivery from Cairo to Damascus in four days.  He built bridges, irrigation and shipping canals, improved the harbours, and built mosques. He was a patron of Islamic science, such as his support for the medical research of his Arab physician, Ibn al-Nafis. As a testament of a special relationship between Islam and cats, Baibars left a cat garden in Cairo as a waqf, providing the cats of Cairo with food and shelter.

His memoirs were recorded in Sirat al-Zahir Baibars ("Life of al-Zahir Baibars"), a popular Arabic romance recording his battles and achievements. He has a heroic status in Kazakhstan, as well as in Egypt, Palestine, Lebanon and Syria.

Al-Madrassa al-Zahiriyya is the school built adjacent to his Mausoleum in Damascus. The Az-Zahiriyah Library has a wealth of manuscripts in various branches of knowledge to this day.

See also
Ablaq
Bahri dynasty
Cumania
Cuman people
Kipchak people
Mosque of al-Zahir Baybars
Sirat al-Zahir Baibars

References

Sources

External links
Baibars article from Encyclopedia of the Orient
Baibars in Concise Britannica online
Al-Madrassa al-Zahiriyya and Baybars Mausoleum
Brief Article in Columbia Encyclopedia
Extensive Arabic Article on Baybars
Brief Biography

Muslims of the Seventh Crusade
Muslims of Lord Edward's crusade
Medieval Palestine
1223 births
1277 deaths
Generals of the medieval Islamic world
Bahri sultans
Cumans
13th-century Mamluk sultans
One Thousand and One Nights characters
Medieval slaves
13th-century Kipchacks